Potassium formate, HCO2K, HCOOK, or CHKO2, is the potassium salt of formic acid. This strongly hygroscopic white solid is an intermediate in the formate potash process for the production of potassium. Potassium formate has also been studied as a potential environmentally friendly deicing salt for use on roads. It has also been suggested for use in a less corrosive liquid desiccant. Potassium formate brines are sometimes used for heat transfer, despite being much more corrosive than many other liquid coolants, especially to zinc and aluminum but even to many steels,
though some formulations are compatible with aluminum and steels.

References

Formates
Potassium compounds